The James Speyer House was a mansion located at 1058 Fifth Avenue, on the southeast corner of 87th Street, in the Upper East Side of Manhattan, New York City. It was constructed for James Speyer, a New York City banker. It was a reticent classicizing block of three stories and a set-back attic story over a sunk basement lit by a light well. It had five bays on the avenue, where the upper two floors were linked by a colossal order of pilasters, and seven bays on the side street.

Further reading

References

Demolished buildings and structures in Manhattan
Fifth Avenue
Houses in Manhattan
Upper East Side